Underwater hockey at the 2019 Southeast Asian Games was contested at the Vermosa Sports Hub in Imus, Cavite, Philippines. Two events each for men and women, namely 4-on-4 and 6-on-6 were contested at the games. The tournaments marked Malaysia's debut in an international competition outside their country.

Participating nations

Medal summary

Medal table

Medalists

Men's competition

4x4

6x6

Women's competition

4x4

6x6

References

External links
 

 
2019 Southeast Asian Games events